Hynobius  is a genus of salamander (Asian salamanders) in the family Hynobiidae, occurring in Japan, Korea, China, Taiwan and Far East Russia.

It contains these species:

Species
Species included (as of March 2021):

Hynobius abei Sato, 1934
Hynobius abuensis Matsui, Okawa, Nishikawa, and Tominaga, 2019
Hynobius akiensis Matsui, Okawa, and Nishikawa, 2019
Hynobius amakusaensis Nishikawa and Matsui, 2014
Hynobius amjiensis Gu, 1992
Hynobius arisanensis Maki, 1922
Hynobius bakan Matsui, Okawa, and Nishikawa, 2019
Hynobius boulengeri (Thompson, 1912)
Hynobius chinensis Günther, 1889
Hynobius dunni Tago, 1931
Hynobius formosanus Maki, 1922
Hynobius fossigenus Okamiya, Sugawara, Nagano, and Poyarkov, 2018
Hynobius fucus Lai and Lue, 2008
Hynobius glacialis Lai and Lue, 2008
Hynobius geojeensis Min and Borzée, 2021
Hynobius guabangshanensis Shen, 2004
Hynobius guttatus Tominaga, Matsui, Tanabe, and Nishikawa, 2019
Hynobius hidamontanus Matsui, 1987
Hynobius hirosei Lantz, 1931
Hynobius ikioi Matsui, Nishikawa, and Tominaga, 2017
Hynobius iwami Matsui, Okawa, Nishikawa, and Tominaga, 2019
Hynobius katoi Matsui, Kokuryo, Misawa, and Nishikawa, 2004
Hynobius kimurae Dunn, 1923
Hynobius kuishiensis Tominaga, Matsui, Tanabe, and Nishikawa, 2019
Hynobius leechii Boulenger, 1887
Hynobius lichenatus Boulenger, 1883
Hynobius maoershanensis Zhou, Jiang, and Jiang, 2006
Hynobius mikawaensis Matsui, Misawa, Nishikawa, and Shimada, 2017
Hynobius naevius (Temminck and Schlegel, 1838)
Hynobius nebulosus (Temminck and Schlegel, 1838)
Hynobius nigrescens Stejneger, 1907
Hynobius notialis Min and Borzée, 2021
Hynobius okiensis Sato, 1940
Hynobius osumiensis Nishikawa and Matsui, 2014
Hynobius oyamai Tominaga, Matsui, and Nishikawa, 2019
Hynobius perplicatus Min and Borzée, 2021
Hynobius quelpaertensis Mori, 1928
Hynobius retardatus Dunn, 1923
Hynobius sematonotos Tominaga, Matsui, and Nishikawa, 2019
Hynobius setoi Matsui, Tanabe, and Misawa, 2019
Hynobius setouchi Matsui, Okawa, Tanabe, and Misawa, 2019
Hynobius shinichisatoi Nishikawa and Matsui, 2014
Hynobius sonani (Maki, 1922)
Hynobius stejnegeri Dunn, 1923
Hynobius takedai Matsui and Miyazaki, 1984
Hynobius tokyoensis Tago, 1931
Hynobius tosashimizuensis Sugawara, Watabe, Yoshikawa, and Nagano, 2018
Hynobius tsuensis Abé, 1922
Hynobius tsurugiensis Tominaga, Matsui, Tanabe, and Nishikawa, 2019
Hynobius turkestanicus Nikolskii, 1910
Hynobius unisacculus Min, Baek, Song, Chang, and Poyarkov, 2016
Hynobius utsunomiyaorum Matsui and Okawa, 2019
Hynobius vandenburghi Dunn, 1923
Hynobius yangi Kim, Min, and Matsui, 2003
Hynobius yiwuensis Cai, 1985

References

External links
  [web application]. 2008. Berkeley, California: Hynobius. AmphibiaWeb, available at https://web.archive.org/web/20040827082534/http://www.amphibiaweb.org/ (Accessed: July 28, 2008).

 
Amphibian genera
Taxa named by Johann Jakob von Tschudi
Taxonomy articles created by Polbot